was a Japanese freestyle swimmer who competed in the 1932 and 1936 Summer Olympics. In 1932 she was a member of the Japanese relay team that finished fifth in the 4×100 mm freestyle relay. In the 100 m freestyle competition she was eliminated in the first round. Four years later she finished sixth in the 400 m freestyle. In the 100 m freestyle competition she was eliminated in the semi-finals, and as part of the Japanese 4 × 100 m relay team she was eliminated in the first round.

References

1916 births
1992 deaths
Japanese female freestyle swimmers
Olympic swimmers of Japan
Swimmers at the 1932 Summer Olympics
Swimmers at the 1936 Summer Olympics
20th-century Japanese women